Cycais is a genus of Asian corinnid sac spiders first described by Tamerlan Thorell in 1877.  it contains only two species, one from Sulawesi and one from Japan.

References

Araneomorphae genera
Corinnidae
Spiders of Asia
Taxa named by Tamerlan Thorell